Burnie Rugby Union Club is a Rugby Union club in Tasmania. It was established in 1961, was dormant in the late 1980s and reformed in 1997. The club is a member of the Tasmanian Rugby Union, affiliated with the Australian Rugby Union, and plays in the Tasmanian Statewide League men's First Division.
 
The club's home ground is at Upper Burnie sports centre  in the Burnie, Tasmania. Known as "the Emus", the club colours are blue and red. The club fields a team in Men's First Division along with a Women's team in the statewide competition.

History - post-reformation
The club was reformed in 1997 after a seven-year absence from competition.  With the encouragement of Ron Willet, a prop forward and Northern Tasmanian President from Launceston, meetings commenced with Ken Allan & Shane Bentley at Burnie’s Beach hotel. Former Burnie president Brett "Crusty" Kershaw came on board as player and treasurer. Peter Letcher was recruited as coach for the side. Warren and Robbie Taylor came on board as manager and secretary respectively.

Past player Fergie Baird assisted in locating some lost funds that had been set aside for future club use. Kershaw paid for the club's first insurance bill and the Emus were reestablished.

The Northern Competition at that time comprised Burnie, Devonport, two Launceston teams, Georgetown, and the West Coast Miners (the last two are now defunct). The Emus played in the Acton Rugby and Softball ground which they shared in and developed. In 2003 the club moved to the Montello Sporting Grounds, the home of the Burnie United Soccer Club. After six years the club parted ways with Montello and moved to the McKenna Park Regional Sporting Complex in early 2009.

Burnie has played in three Northern Grand Finals since 1997, winning one in 2003 defeating Launceston at Montello Sporting Ground in a memorable 14 -10. Big Willie Johnson scored the winning try under the posts with Josh Baldwin converting to secure the victory on the day. Burnie had narrowly lost in two grand finals to the Devonport Bulls. 
 
In 2008 after its first season of the Statewide Second Division, Burnie won the championship with a more than convincing victory over Glenorchy.

In 2009 the Emus participated in the revised Statewide First Division Competition. Burnie is back in the Statewide First Division after a 20-year absence.

Officials
The current President is Isabella Hardy, the first female and youngest person to ever take on the role. Women's coach Brett "Crusty" Kershaw is Vice President. Vanessa Davies is the current Secretary and Melissa Coull is the Treasurer.

Premierships

Senior Team
Northern Championship: 1964,2003
Statewide Second Division: 2008
Statewide First Division: 1979,1986

References

External links
Australian Rugby Union
Tasmanian Rugby Union
Burnie Rugby Union Club

Rugby union teams in Tasmania
Women's rugby union in Tasmania
Sport in Burnie, Tasmania
Rugby clubs established in 1961
1961 establishments in Australia